Dreadnought is a combat flight simulation game developed by Six Foot and Yager Development, and published by Grey Box. Following a closed beta phase, the game was released for PlayStation 4 in December 2017, followed by a release for Microsoft Windows in October 2018. 

On December 15, 2022, it was announced that the game would be put offline on March 19, 2023, at 11 am Central Standard Time.

Gameplay 
The player is the captain of a large spacecraft and uses projectile weapons to attack. The player is able to choose between several classes of ships, each with drawbacks and advantages in categories like speed and size. The ships are massive and are intended to give the feel of being a commander, not a rogue bounty hunter. As a result, gameplay involves large amounts of strategy and positioning. In addition to positioning the ship and choosing targets, the player may also allocate power to various parts of the ship. These areas include shields, weapons and engines.

Multiplayer 
In multiplayer, coordinated attacks and focus fire are important. Other players may choose to heal a damaged teammate. Matches last around ten minutes and players may switch ship classes after death depending on the match type.

References

External links 
 

2017 video games
Free-to-play video games
PlayStation 4 games
Space combat simulators
Unreal Engine games
Video games developed in Germany
Windows games
PlayStation 4 Pro enhanced games
Yager Development games